Muránska Lehota is a village and municipality in Revúca District in the Banská Bystrica Region of Slovakia, located in the southern part of the Slovak Ore Mountains. There are two fishing ponds located on the territory of the village known as the "Upper Pond" and the "Lower Pond".

History
The village was founded in the 15th century. Local population has been active in sheep farming, wood and charcoal production as well as in agriculture. The population has steadily grown to about 500 in 19th century and remained stable up until the World War II as the natural population growth has been offset by steady emigration. In 1826, a Roman Catholic church dedicated to the Nativity of Mary was constructed, which contains a bell originally located at the nearby Muráň Castle After the war and forced collectivization of agriculture, the population started to slowly decrease to the current level of about 200 predominantly senior citizens.

Transportation
The village is connected via a road with a nearby village of Muráň and the small town of Tisovec. There is also a bus line connecting the towns of Tisovec and Revúca, which crosses Muránska Lehota and Muráň. The Muráň village is also reachable in about 30 minutes on foot through a forest trail crossing the Príslop hill. This trail is a part of marked hiking trail no. 0914.

Image gallery

References

External links
 
 
https://web.archive.org/web/20160803201656/http://muranskalehota.e-obce.sk/

Villages and municipalities in Revúca District